Robert J. "Bob" Twiggs is a Professor of Astronautics and Space Science at Morehead State University. He is responsible, along with Jordi Puig-Suari of California Polytechnic State University, for co-inventing the CubeSat reference design for miniaturized satellites which became an Industry Standard for design and deployment of the satellites.

Education
Twiggs earned a Bachelor of Science in Electrical and Electronics Engineering from the University of Idaho in 1961 and a Master of Science in Electrical Engineering with a concentration in microwave devices from Stanford University in 1964.

Career
From 1985 to 1994, Twiggs was the director of the Weber State University Center for Aerospace Technology. He served as a consulting professor in the Stanford University Department of Aeronautics and Astronautics from 1994 to 2008. At Stanford, he established the Space Systems Development Laboratory. Bob Twiggs became a professor at Morehead State University in 2009 in an effort to push the PocketQube standard leveraging the University's large aperture (21m) space tracking system, and to help develop a space economy in the state of Kentucky.

In 2019, Twiggs designed and proposed another smaller, simpler satellite form factor called ThinSat which could enable high school students to design and build satellites.

References

External links 
 Official site
 
 Satellite pioneer joins Morehead State's space science faculty

Morehead State University faculty
Living people
Rocket scientists
University of Idaho alumni
1927 births
Weber State University faculty